Maria L. Marcus (June 23, 1933 – April 27, 2022) was an American lawyer who served as a Joseph M. McLaughlin Professor of Law at Fordham University.

Early life and family
Marcus was born as Maria Eleanor Erica Lenhoff on 23 June 1933 in Vienna, Austria in a Jewish family. She received a bachelor's degree in English from Oberlin College in 1954 and law degree in 1957 from Yale Law School. She was married to Norman Marcus.

Career
Between 1961 and 1967, Marcus was an associate counsel for the NAACP.
From 1967 to 1978, she was an Assistant Attorney General. In 1976, she became the chief of the office's litigation bureau where she worked until 1978.

In 1978, she joined Fordham University as a professor and became the second woman to attain tenured full professor status.

In 2011, she was retired as a professor.

Publications
 Austria's Pre-War Brown v. Board of Education
 Foreword: Is There a Threat to Judicial Independence in the United States Today
 Policing Speech on the Airwaves: Granting Rights, Preventing Wrongs
 Learning Together: Justice Marshall's Desegregation Opinions
 Wanted: A Federal Standard for Evaluating the Adequate State Forum
 Federal Habeas Corpus After State Court Default: A Definition of Cause and Prejudice
 Conjugal Violence: The Law of Force and the Force of Law

References

1933 births
2022 deaths
Austrian emigrants to the United States
American lawyers
American people of Austrian-Jewish descent
Fordham University faculty
Oberlin College alumni
Yale Law School alumni
American women lawyers